The 1957 Tampa Spartans football team represented the University of Tampa in the 1957 NCAA College Division football season. It was the Spartans' 21st season. The team was led by head coach Marcelino Huerta, in his sixth year, and played their home games at Phillips Field in Tampa, Florida. They finished with a record of six wins and three losses (6–3).

Schedule

References

Tampa
Tampa Spartans football seasons
Tampa Spartans football